Sereno may refer to:

Music 
 Sereno (album), a 2002 album by Miguel Bosé

People

Given name 
 Sereno Edwards Bishop (1827–1909), scientist, Presbyterian minister and publisher
 Sereno E. Brett (1891–1952), Brigadier General of the United States Army
 Sereno Edwards Dwight (1786–1850), American author, educator, minister, and Chaplain of the Senate
 Sereno Peck Fenn (1844–1927), American businessman
 Sereno E. Payne (1843–1914), United States Representative from New York
 Sereno Watson (1826–1892), American botanist

Surname 
 Costantino Sereno (1829–1893), Italian painter
 Henrique Sereno (born 1985), Portuguese footballer
 Maria Lourdes Sereno (born 1960), de facto Chief Justice of the Supreme Court of the Philippines between August 25, 2012 and May 11, 2018
 Paul Sereno (born 1957), American paleontologist
 Paulo Jorge Fernandes Sereno (born 1983), Portuguese footballer
 Ronaldo Marques Sereno (born 1962), Brazilian footballer

Occupations
, a neighborhood night watchman and key custodian, primarily in Spain

Places 
 Sereno, Missouri, United States
 Sereno del Mar, California, United States
 Sereno River, Brazil
 Río Sereno, Panama

See also 
 El Sereno (disambiguation)